Shelley Appleton (born New York City, June 11, 1919, died New York City, July 27, 2005) was a local union manager and later Vice-President and General Secretary-Treasurer of the International Ladies' Garment Workers' Union.

Biography

A graduate of New York University (B.A., LL.B. 1940), Appleton was an organizer in the Eastern Out-of-Town Department from 1941 to 1942. After serving in the United States Army Air Forces in World War II and earning a Bronze Star for his service, Appleton became Business Agent in the ILGWU's Office and Distribution Employees Local 99 in 1946. 

In 1951, Appleton was elected Assistant Manager of Local 99, and in 1953, Manager of Local 99. In 1959, Appleton left Local 99 to become manager of the Skirt and Sportswear Workers Local 23, a position he maintained through the merger of Local 23 and 25 to create Local 23–25. In 1961, he was elected a Vice-President of the ILGWU. He retired from the ILGWU in 1983.

In addition to his work with the ILGWU, Appleton served as chairman of the ILGWU's international affairs committee, member of the Women's American ORT (Organization for Rehabilitation through Training), board member of the National Committee for Rural Schools, treasurer of the Reunion of Old Timers, chairman of the World ORT Union (1980-1983), and president of the Tamiment Institute (1986-2005).

Sources
ILGWU. Communication Department biography files. 5780/177. Kheel Center for Labor Management Documentation and Archives, Cornell University.

"Shelley Appleton, Garment Union Official, 86." New York Times. 29 Jul. 2005. Web. 26 Jan 2011.

International Ladies Garment Workers Union leaders
1919 births
2005 deaths
Trade unionists from New York (state)
New York University School of Law alumni
United States Army personnel of World War II